Jada Talley (born February 20, 1999) is an American professional soccer player who plays as a forward for KuPS of the Finnish Kansallinen Liiga.

Talley spent four years of her collegiate career with the Arizona Wildcats before transferring to the USC Trojans for one season. She was drafted 31st overall in the 2022 NWSL Draft by Orlando Pride before signing short-term contracts with Kansas City Current and Portland Thorns. In July she moved to Finland to sign with KuPS.

Early life
Born in Corona, California, Talley was a four-year letterwinner at Centennial High School, where she played forward for the Huskies. As a freshman she was named first-team All-Big XIII Division and Offensive Player of the Year. She played club soccer for ECNL team So Cal Blues.

College career
Talley played five seasons of college soccer, joining the Wildcats at the University of Arizona in 2017 before transferring to the University of Southern California in 2021. As a freshman she made 18 appearances but started in only one, scoring one goal and assisting twice. In her sophomore year, Talley started in 19 of 20 appearances and led the team in goals with seven, adding one assist. Individually she earned All-Pac-12 Conference third-team honors. In 2019, Talley started all 20 of Arizona's games and scored a career-high and a school-record 10 goals and eight assists for a combined 28 points. She was recognized individually with All-Pac-12 first-team and United Soccer Coaches All-Pacific Region second-team selections. In 2020, Talley once again started every game, making 15 appearances during the shortened schedule as a result of the COVID-19 pandemic. She scored six goals and six assists on the way to All-Pac-12 second-team honors. In 2021, Talley opted to use the additional year of eligibility granted by the NCAA due to the COVID-19 pandemic, transferring within the Pac-12 to play for the USC Trojans. With 24 goals and 16 assists, Talley departed Arizona as fourth on both career lists in Wildcats program history. Talley made 15 starts in 18 appearances as a redshirt senior for USC, scoring three goals and making two assists.

Club career
Talley was automatically available for selection during the 2021 NWSL Draft as a result of exhausting three years of college eligibility. Despite not being drafted, her NWSL playing rights were picked up by Racing Louisville a week later on January 21, 2021. Having transferred to USC to contest the 2021 season and exhaust her remaining college eligibility instead, the NWSL allowed any player added to an NWSL team's discovery list as an undrafted free agent but who would otherwise be draft eligible to be removed in order to register for the 2022 NWSL Draft. On December 18, 2021, Talley was selected in the third round (31st overall) of the 2022 NWSL Draft by Orlando Pride. She trained with the team during preseason and remained with Orlando during the early part of the season despite not being signed to a contract.

On May 21, 2022, Talley was signed by Kansas City Current as a short-term COVID replacement player and made her professional debut that evening as an 85th minute substitute in a 1–0 defeat by Angel City FC. She was named as an unused substitute four days later against OL Reign before the end of her short-term contract.

On June 28, 2022, Talley signed as a National Team Replacement player for Portland Thorns. She was named as an unused substitute twice in July before her contract was terminated without making an appearance.

On July 20, 2022, Talley signed a contract with Finnish Kansallinen Liiga team KuPS for the remainder of the 2022 season.

Career statistics

College summary

Club summary

References

External links
 Arizona Wildcats bio
 USC Trojans bio
 

1999 births
Living people
Sportspeople from Corona, California
American women's soccer players
Women's association football forwards
Soccer players from California
Arizona Wildcats women's soccer players
USC Trojans women's soccer players
Orlando Pride draft picks
Kansas City Current players
Portland Thorns FC players
National Women's Soccer League players
Kansallinen Liiga players
Expatriate women's footballers in Finland
American expatriate sportspeople in Finland